Chorizanthe brevicornu is a species of flowering plant in the buckwheat family which is known by the common name brittle spineflower. It is native to the southwestern United States and northern Mexico, where it is widely distributed but is most abundant in the deserts.

The plant extends an erect, naked, highly branching stem which is greenish in color. Most of the leaves grow from the base of the plant, but a few small ones may appear up on the stem. At the end of each of the many branches is a tube-shaped inflorescence which opens into a tiny white or greenish-yellow flower a few millimeters wide.

There are two subvarieties of C. brevicornu.

External links
Jepson Manual Treatment: Chorizanthe brevicornu
Chorizanthe brevicornu - U.C. Photo gallery

brevicornu
Flora of the Southwestern United States
Flora of Northwestern Mexico
Flora of the California desert regions
Flora of the Sonoran Deserts
Natural history of the Mojave Desert
Taxa named by John Torrey
Flora without expected TNC conservation status